Atauro (Tetum and Indonesian: Pulau Atauro or Ata'uro), also known as Kambing Island, is an island and municipality (or ) of East Timor. Atauro is a small oceanic island situated north of Dili, on the extinct Wetar segment of the volcanic Inner Banda Arc, between the Indonesian islands of Alor and Wetar. The nearest island is the Indonesian island of Liran,  to the northeast. At the 2015 census, it had 9,274 inhabitants. 

Atauro was one of the administrative posts (formerly subdistricts) of Dili Municipality until it became a separate municipality with effect from 1 January 2022.

Etymology 
Atauro means 'goat' in the local language, and the island is also known as Kambing Island (Pulau Kambing) by the Indonesians (Kambing means 'goat' in Indonesian). The island was so named because of the large number of goats kept there.

Geography 

The island is administratively divided into five sucos, each surrounding a village: Biqueli and Beloi in the north, Macadade (formerly Anartutu) in the southwest, and Maquili and Vila Maumeta in the southeast. Vila Maumeta is the largest village.  Other major communities include Pala, Uaroana, Arlo, Adara, and Berau.  One bitumen road connects Vila Maumeta to Pala, and there are walking paths to the other villages on the island. During Indonesian rule, there was an airstrip north of Vila Maumeta, but now it is unusable by fixed-wing aircraft (IATA designation: AUT (WPAT)).

At 999 m above sea level, Mount Manucoco is the island's highest point. The ocean strait between Atauro and Timor drops 3500 m below sea level; conversely, it is much shallower along the ridge leading to Wetar. Geologists from Melbourne University are working together with the East Timor Energy Minerals and Resources Directorate (EMRD) and the Polytechnical Institute of Dili to make the first geological map of the island, in part to improve the infrastructure of the island.

The Berlin Nakroma, a gift from Germany, is a ferry that connects the island to the capital Dili; the trip takes about two hours. Dili can also be reached by fishermen's boats. Atauro is also being considered as a destination for eco-tourism, and its coral reefs are being discovered by scuba enthusiasts.

Atauro is a small, unstable island with a rugged landscape, plagued by frequent landslides, as well as a shortage of fresh water, especially during the drier months. Freshwater springs are present approximately 2 km north of Berau, with minor reservoirs around Macadade and the eastern slopes of Mount Manucoco. Wells along the coast provide poor-quality water to most coastal townships. In 2004, Portugal funded a project to improve the availability of water and its distribution infrastructure, but a critical water shortage persists.

Subdivisions
Atauro Municipality is divided into the following Sucos:
 Suco Beloi
 Suco Biqueli
 Suco Macadade
 Suco Maquili
 Suco Vila

Environment

The landscape of the island is a result of the erosion of uplifted, originally submarine, volcanos from the Neogene period creating narrow, dissected ridges and steep slopes. Up to an elevation of about 600 m there are also extensive areas of uplifted coralline limestone. The climate is distinctly seasonal, with wet and dry seasons. The island has suffered from extensive clearing of its native vegetation for swidden agriculture. The upper levels of Mount Manucoco (above 700 m) still carry patches of tropical semi-evergreen mountain forest in sheltered valleys, covering about 40 km2. Lower down there are remnants of drier forest and Eucalyptus alba dominated savanna woodlands, especially on limestone outcrops, with agricultural land in the vicinity of villages. The island has a fringing reef 30–150 m in width; it generally lacks freshwater wetlands, estuaries and mangroves. In 2016 a Conservation International team found more species of reef fish per site in the waters surrounding the island than anywhere else in the world.

Birds
The whole island, and especially the area around Mount Manucoco, has been identified by BirdLife International as an Important Bird Area (IBA) because it supports populations of bar-necked cuckoo-doves, black cuckoo-doves, Timor green pigeons, pink-headed imperial pigeons, olive-headed lorikeets, plain gerygones, fawn-breasted whistlers, olive-brown orioles, Timor stubtails, Timor leaf warblers, orange-sided thrushes, blue-cheeked flowerpeckers, flame-breasted sunbirds and tricolored parrotfinches.

Culture 
Atauro is unusual in East Timor because many of the northern inhabitants are Protestants, not Catholics. They were evangelized by a Dutch Calvinist mission from Alor in the early 20th century. There are also some Protestants among the southern population.

The people of Atauro speak four dialects of Wetarese (Rahesuk, Resuk, Raklungu, and Dadu'a), which originated on the island of Wetar in Indonesia.

History 

The Netherlands and Portugal agreed Atauro to be Portuguese in the treaty of Lisbon 1859, but the Portuguese flag was not raised before 1884 when there was an official ceremony. The inhabitants of Atauro did not start to pay taxes to Portugal before 1905. Atauro was used as a prison island soon after settlement by the Portuguese.

In Portuguese Timor, Atauro was organized as part of the Dili municipality, coinciding with modern Dili District. When East Timor became independent, there was a proposal to reorganize the districts and split off Atauro as an autonomous area. However, that has not been put into effect, and it remains a subdistrict of Dili District.

On 11 August 1975, when the UDT mounted a coup in a bid to halt the increasing popularity of Fretilin. On 26 August, the Portuguese Governor Mário Lemos Pires fled to Atauro, from where he later attempted to broker an agreement between the two groups. He was urged by Fretilin to return and resume the decolonisation process, but he insisted that he was awaiting instructions from the government in Lisbon, then increasingly uninterested. On 10 December 1975, the Indonesians invaded. In the 1980s, the Indonesians used the island as a prison for East Timorese guerillas. The island became part of independent East Timor on 20 May 2002.

See also
 List of Important Bird Areas in East Timor
 List of islands of East Timor

External links
Australian editorial on Atauro's poverty
Community Run Eco Tourism on Atauro Island
Atauro dolls project

References 

Important Bird Areas of East Timor
Islands of East Timor
Municipalities of East Timor
States and territories established in 2022